The California Junior College Lacrosse Association (CJCLA) was formed in 2013 and is dedicated to expanding junior college lacrosse opportunities for the student-athletes of California. Membership in the CJCLA is open to any California junior college lacrosse program that is officially recognized as a student club by their institution.

The CJCLA mission is to provide new program assistance and consultation, student-athlete eligibility requirements, and hosting of the CJCLA Championship Tournament at the conclusion of the regular season. Different from NCAA, MCLA and other college lacrosse leagues, CJCLA play their season during the fall semester.

CJCLA is currently not sanctioned by California Community College Athletic Association (CCCAA) and is governed by its own elected leadership.

History 
In December 2013 Diablo Valley College Vikings were crowned the first CJCLA champion after a perfect 5-0 season. DVC were awarded "The Little Oak Barrel" championship trophy.

Diablo Valley College Vikings repeated as CJCLA champions in 2014, defeating Santa Barbara City College 15-9 on December 6, 2014.

Teams

Championship history

Leadership 
President: Matt Blamey

Vice President - Growth & Development: Terry Armstrong

Vice President - Business Operations: Don Fagen

Fitness Advisor: Brian Rutherford

Art Director: Mathias Armstrong

SoCal Liaison: Brian Ponzi

References 

College club sports associations in the United States
College lacrosse in the United States
2013 establishments in California